Test Drive Off-Road 3 (4X4 World Trophy in Europe) is a racing video game developed and published by Infogrames North America for Microsoft Windows, PlayStation and Game Boy Color. A Dreamcast version was planned, but was cancelled due to release issues.

Reception

Test Drive: Off-Road 3 received "mixed" reviews on all platforms according to the review aggregation website GameRankings. Doug Trueman of NextGen said that the PlayStation version was "fairly well done, but there are just not enough new features here to raise the game's rating above 'fair.'"

iBot of GamePro said of the PlayStation version in one review, "With Test Drive Off Road 3, Infogrames has delivered a very solid racing game (with a few noticeable flaws) that will really appeal to those who like to drive virtual versions of real cars, but are tired of the paved highways and byways of the other racing titles." However, Air Hendrix said in another review that the same console version's "slick stylings won't give gamers enough meaty gameplay to go the distance. If you're hardcore about off-road action, Test Drive Off-Road 3s worth renting to check out the cool rides, but everyone else should steer clear."

Notes

References

External links

1999 video games
Accolade (company) games
Cancelled Dreamcast games
Game Boy Color games
Infogrames games
Multiplayer and single-player video games
Off-road racing video games
PlayStation (console) games
Off-Road 3
Video game sequels
Video games developed in the United States
Windows games
Xantera games